P. Amudha is an Indian civil servant, a 1994 batch IAS officer of Tamil Nadu cadre who is currently working  as Additional Secretary in Prime Minister's Office. She was  working as a professor of Public Administration at the Lal Bahadur Shastri National Academy of Administration in Mussoorie, Uttarakhand. She was the executive director of the Tamil Nadu Corporation for Development of Women under Tamil Nadu Government and has worked as a program officer with the United Nations Children's Fund for Water and Sanitation. She has worked in fifteen different departments under Government of Tamil Nadu. She is known for her penchant for being on the field and taking bold decisions.

Career 

P. Amudha started her career as an IAS officer from 4 September 1994 in Tamil Nadu cadre. Initially, she was appointed as collector of Dharmapuri district in Tamil Nadu. She was additional chief electoral officer in the Public (Elections) Department in the Tamil Nadu Government. Prior to this position, she served in the Health and Family Welfare Department of the Tamil Nadu Government as project director and member-secretary of the Tamil Nadu State AIDS Control Society. She was the executive director for the Tamil Nadu Corporation for Development of Women in the Tamil Nadu Government, and has worked as program officer with the United Nations Children's Fund for Water and Sanitation. For many years, she was also the district collector with the Land Revenue Management and District Administration.

On 11 March 2019, P. Amudha was appointed as professor of Public Administration at Lal Bahadur Shastri National Academy of Administration (LBSNAA).

Sports 
P. Amudha is a kabaddi player. She was a member of the kabbadi team that won the national championship thrice. She is also trained in karate.

References 

Living people
1970 births
Indian Administrative Service officers
People from Tamil Nadu
People from Madurai
Prime Minister's Office (India)
Indian government officials
District magistrate